The Sydney Fringe Festival is the largest independent arts festival in New South Wales with over 450 events presented in over 70 venues across Greater Sydney each year during September. It encompasses genres such as stand-up comedy, music, theatre, cabaret, visual arts, and burlesque. 

Outside of September, the Sydney Fringe Festival advocate for artists, agitate for change and activate unused space creating new cultural infrastructure and precincts.

The Sydney Fringe, began as a curated festival (like the New York International Fringe Festival) as opposed to an open access "unjuried" festival (the model used by the Edinburgh Fringe Festival). In 2012, festival director Richard Hull implemented the open access festival model.

The Sydney Fringe typically operates in a festival precinct encompassing a number of venues in the Inner West/Sydney CBD area, with a few other venues in the wider Sydney area, including Leichhardt, Parramatta, Oxford Street and Hurstville. After a 2 year hiatus due to COVID-19 pandemic the Sydney Fringe Festival returned to Sydney.

Previous Sydney Fringe Festivals
The Sydney Fringe Festival ran from 1994 to 2002 in Bondi, founded by producer Victoria Harbutt and Megan Donnelly who were assisted fantastically by Cathy Carlsson, Sylvia DeAngelis, Gil Summons and Lucia Mastrantone” for four years and Katrina Sedgwick for one year. The Live Bait Festival, a successor to the Sydney Fringe Festival, also operated out of Bondi from 2003 to 2004 and was co-produced by Michael Cohen and Glenn Wright.

References

External links
 

Fringe festivals in Australia
Festivals in Sydney
Newtown, New South Wales
2010 establishments in Australia